The Miles M.77 Sparrowjet was a twin-engined jet-powered racing aircraft built by the British aircraft manufacturer F.G. Miles Limited. It was a one-off conversion, involving the fitting of Turbomeca Palas turbojet engines to the prototype Miles Sparrowhawk, enabling the aircraft to achieve higher performance than could be achieved with its conventional piston engine arrangement.

The Sparrowhawk had been a racing aircraft developed and produced in small numbers by Miles Aircraft during the 1930s. During the late 1950s, the owner of one such aircraft, Fred Dunkerley, requested that Miles look into converting the type to use jet propulsion for greater performance. During December 1959, the company received the aircraft to perform the extensive modification programme; in addition to the installation of French Palas turbojets, the original piston engine was eliminated while the forward fuselage was entirely replaced and rebuilt with the cockpit in a more forward position. The conversion took almost three years to perform.

On 14 December 1953, the completed Sparrowjet conducted its maiden flight. While the aircraft proved to be capable of speeds in excess of 200 mph, it was noted to accelerate somewhat slowly. Its owner quickly put it to use as a somewhat unique racing aircraft for the era, a factor which likely aided the Sparrowjet in multiple victories, including the SBAC Challenge Cup on 21 May 1956, and the King's Cup Race on 13 July 1957, the latter in which the aircraft had reported attained a maximum speed of 228 mph (367 km/h). However, the Sparrowjet was heavily damaged by a hangar fire while being stored at RAF Upton during July 1964, ending its racing career.

Design and development
During the 1930s, the British aviation company Miles Aircraft produced half a dozen Miles Sparrowhawks, a relatively successful piston-powered racing aircraft. The prototype, G-ADNL, proved itself to be a relatively fast aircraft amongst its contemporaries, being frequently raced by multiple owners throughout the late 1930s and 1940s, often emerging as the victor. During the late 1940s, it was acquired by the racing enthusiast Fred Dunkerley; he decided to approach Miles with the suggestion to convert the aircraft to harness the relatively recently discovered method of jet propulsion as a means of increasing its performance.

It was quickly recognised that such a conversion would involve extensive modifications to the airframe, including the near-complete replacement of the forward fuselage and tail unit. As one means of addressing the center of balance changes from removing the forward-mounted piston engine, the pilot was repositioned to the nose and seated within a new clear canopy, necessitating a seven foot extension of the aircraft's length. The French Turbomeca Palas, a centrifugal flow turbojet engine, was selected to power the type; in order to accommodate a pair of these engines within its wing root area, the wing required multiple modifications.

One of the positive impacts produced by eliminating the propeller was that the aircraft needed much less ground clearance, thus a new undercarriage with much shorter legs was installed to take advantage of this. The new cockpit provided its pilot with an atypically high level of exterior visibility; this attribute was viewed as particularly helpful in competitive racing for better enabling the pilot to monitor the positions of other racing aircraft. To reflect the extensive changes that had been made to it, the aircraft was redesignated as the M.77 Sparrowjet.

During December 1950, the Sparrowhawk arrived at Miles' Redhill facility to commence conversion; during 1952, mid-way through the conversion, the aircraft was relocated to Shoreham via road as a result of Miles' relocation. On 14 December 1953, the completed Sparrowjet conducted its maiden flight, being piloted by George Miles, the flight was reportedly his first in a jet-powered aircraft. It was quickly determined that the aircraft's maximum speed was in excess of 200 MPH, although its relatively slow rate of acceleration was also observed, a factor that has been attributed to the power output of the Palas engine being a somewhat modest 330 lb per engine (when flown at sea level).

Operational history

Following the completion of modification work to become the Sparrowjet, the aircraft was accepted by Dunkerley and quickly entered into various air races, such as the Goodyear Air Challenge Trophy at Shoreham on 28 August 1954. In addition to racing, the Sparrowjet also performed numerous aerial displays, including one at Baginton during the Royal Aero Club race in July, where it had been prevented from participating in the race directly owing to an air starter fault. Prior to the discovery of the fault, the occasion had been intended to be the Sparrowjet's racing debut; this would occur roughly two months later at the Southern Aero Club Invitation Race, which was also held at Shoreham.

The Sparrowjet's performance was such that, in several different races, the aircraft managed to surpass all of its competitors. It was being piloted by Dunkerley when the Sparrowjet won the SBAC Challenge Cup at Yeadon, West Yorkshire on 21 May 1956, having reportedly achieved an average speed of 197.5 mph. On 13 July 1957, the King's Cup Race was also won by the Sparrowjet, having attained a maximum speed of 228 mph (367 km/h) while doing so. This race was a particular triumph for Miles as aircraft built by the firm had achieved first, second, third, fourth and fifth places, a feat that has never been achieved by any other manufacturer according to aviation author Don Brown.

For a time, the Sparrowjet was based at British European Airways's (BEA) main engineering base. During the early 1960s, it was transferred to RAF Upton in Wiltshire, England. The Sparrowjet was in storage at RAF Upton when it was severely damaged by a hangar fire in July 1964; at the time, it was only partially assembled, with items such as its engines having been removed. During 2004, the remains of the Sparrowjet were reportedly being rebuilt by a group based in the Bristol area, who were said to be making use of discarded components from the 1950/53 conversion to aid the restoration effort. The rebuild was still ongoing in early 2012.

According to aviation author Don Berliner, the Sparrowjet remains the only custom built turbojet-powered racing aircraft to have ever participated in officially recognised pylon racing.

Specifications

References

Citations

Bibliography

 Amos, Peter. and Don Lambert Brown. Miles Aircraft Since 1925, Volume 1. London: Putnam Aeronautical, 2000. .
 Berliner, Don. History's Most Important Racing Aircraft. Pen & Sword Books Limited, 2014. .
 Brown, Don Lambert. Miles Aircraft Since 1925. London: Putnam & Company Ltd., 1970. . 
 Jackson, A.J. British Civil Aircraft 1919–1972: Volume III. London: Putnam, 1988. .
 Temple, Julian C. Wings Over Woodley - The Story of Miles Aircraft and the Adwest Group. Bourne End, Bucks, UK: Aston Publications, 1987. .

External links

 Miles Aircraft

Racing aircraft
1950s British sport aircraft
Sparrowjet
Twinjets
Aircraft first flown in 1953